The Leucosporidiales are an order of fungi in the Microbotryomycetes class of the Basidiomycota. The order contains a single family, the Leucosporidiaceae, which in turn contains three genera and eight species. The order was circumscribed in 2003; the family was first described in 1981, but the naming was invalid, and subsequently redescribed in 2001.

References

External links
 

 
Basidiomycota orders
Monotypic fungus taxa